Víctor Rodríguez (born 22 December 1974) is a Mexican former wrestler who competed in the 1996 Summer Olympics.

References

1974 births
Living people
Olympic wrestlers of Mexico
Wrestlers at the 1996 Summer Olympics
Mexican male sport wrestlers